X-Men: Regenesis is a comic book branding used by Marvel Comics that ran through the X-Men family of books beginning in October 2011, following the end of the X-Men: Schism miniseries.  This realignment of the mutant population is ahead of the 2012 Marvel event Avengers vs. X-Men which begins during Regenesis with the mini series Avengers: X-Sanction and brings back Cable, who was previously thought to be dead following the events of X-Men: Second Coming.

Publication history
In a panel at the October 2011 New York Comic Con, writer Kieron Gillen revealed that Cyclops' team will become a peacekeeping force, while Dan Abnett and Andy Lanning's New Mutants will continue to focus on Dani Moonstar's mission by Cyclops of integrating the mutants that were left over by the X-Men. In Generation Hope, written by James Asmus, Sebastian Shaw's storyline will spin out of his prior appearance in Uncanny X-Men, and that the first mission for Hope's team will be to hunt down a new mutant signature. "The book is going to spiral wildly from there, including all the hormones and kissing that a teenage book should have," said Asmus. In X-Men, writer Victor Gischler will explore Jubilee's role on the team. Writer Greg Pak, however, demurred on his plans for Astonishing X-Men, or the details behind the teaser poster of Storm passionately kissing Cyclops, though an additional teaser poster was displayed featuring a character with golden claws. In writer Jason Aaron's flagship book, Wolverine and the X-Men, Wolverine will take on the headmaster role at the Jean Grey School for Higher Learning, though the familiar classroom and Danger Room motifs will feature the feral mutant's "twists". The companion five-issue miniseries, Wolverine and the X-Men: Alpha and Omega by  writer/illustrator Brian Wood, will begin with a large battle between Wolverine and Quentin Quire spinning off of "Schism". Editor Daniel Ketchum revealed that X-Men: Legacy will continue the exploration of Rogue's allegiance to Wolverine, and a possible love triangle between her, Magneto and Gambit. Peter David's X-Factor will see the return of Havok and Polaris to that book as X-Factor Investigations' morale is at an all-time low. Marvel Director Of Communications, Publishing & Digital Media Arune Singh, regarding writer Rick Remender's book, Uncanny X-Force, referred to the teaser poster, which features Psylocke, Fantomex, Wolverine, Deadpool and Nightcrawler, commenting, "It's important to pay attention to the art and see who's there and who's not there."

Also announced was a new series, Age of Apocalypse by David Lapham and Roborto De La Torre, spinning directly out of Remender's "Dark Angel Saga" storyline. The ongoing Wolverine series, which is written by Jason Aaron and illustrated by Andy Kubert, will feature, according to writer Jason Aaron, "the biggest Wolverine solo story [that he has] ever done", to which everything Aaron has done in Wolverine has been building. Jeph Loeb and Simone Bianchi's 2012 run on the title will re-introduce Sabretooth. 

After finishing up the "Chaos Theory" arc in X-23, writer Marjorie Liu will be dealing with Hellion's return to the East Coast and getting a babysitting gig from the FF that goes horribly wrong. In Rob Williams' Daken: Dark Wolverine, the main character's typical brutal methods may be given pause when he encounters the Runaways, whom he underestimates.

X-Men divisions
The division is set as follows:

Cyclops's team
 Uncanny X-Men features Cyclops, Colossus, Danger, Emma Frost, Magik, Magneto, Namor, Storm, and Hope Summers.
 X-Men features Storm, Psylocke, Colossus, Domino, Jubilee, and Warpath.
 New Mutants features Danielle Moonstar, Cypher, Magma, Sunspot, Warlock, and X-Man.
 Generation Hope features Hope, No-Girl, Pixie, Primal, Sebastian Shaw, Transonic, Velocidad, and Zero.
 Other characters remaining with Cyclops include Doctor Nemesis, Kavita Rao, Box, Dazzler, Boom-Boom, Lifeguard, Prodigy, Dust, Loa, Surge, Crosta, and the Stepford Cuckoos.

Wolverine's team
 Wolverine and the X-Men features Wolverine, Beast, Husk, Iceman, Kid Omega, Oya, Shadowcat and Lockheed.
 X-Men: Legacy features Rogue, Cannonball, Frenzy, Gambit, Husk, Iceman, and Marvel Girl.
 Astonishing X-Men features Gambit, Iceman, Karma, Northstar, Cecilia Reyes, and Warbird
 Uncanny X-Force features Wolverine, Deadpool, Fantomex, Nightcrawler, Archangel, and Psylocke.
 X-Factor features Jamie Madrox, Banshee, Havok, Longshot, M, Layla Miller, Polaris, Rictor, Shatterstar, Strong Guy, and Wolfsbane.                            
 Other characters at Wolverine's school include Ariel, Armor, Anole, Blindfold, Bling!, Blink, Broo, Chamber, Cipher, Doop, Ernst, Face, Gentle, Glob Herman, Graymalkin, Hellion, Indra, Kid Gladiator, Match, Mercury, Rockslide, Toad, Trance, Krakoa, Angel and Genesis.

Titles involved
X-Men Regenesis #1 (One-Shot)
Wolverine, vol 4. #17–19
Magneto: Not a Hero #1 (#2-4 were  unbannered)
X-Club #1 (#2-5 were unbannered)
Avengers Academy #22 (also bannered as part of Shattered Heroes)
X-23 #17–19 (unbannered, but event of this story happened during Regenesis.)
 Marvel Holiday Magazine 2011 #1

References
 Arrant, Chris. "X-Men: ReGenesis". June 16, 2011
 "'X-Men: Regenesis' Friday Update: More of the Gold Team Is Revealed". ICv2. September 2, 2011

External links
 

Regenesis
2011 in comics
Superhero comics